Skorzewo railway station is a railway station serving the village of Skorzewo, in the Pomeranian Voivodeship, Poland. The station is located on the Nowa Wieś Wielka–Gdynia Port railway. The train services are operated by SKM Tricity.

The station used to be known as Schörendorf under German occupation.

On 15 June 1969 15:40 between Kościerzyna and Skórzewa an accident occurred. The steam locomotive Ty246-84 collided with steam locomotive Ok1-279. The crash killed 7 people and injured 14.

Modernisation
In 2014 the station was modernised.

Train services
The station is served by the following services:
Pomorska Kolej Metropolitalna services (R) Kościerzyna — Gdańsk Port Lotniczy (Airport) — Gdańsk Wrzeszcz — Gdynia Główna
Pomorska Kolej Metropolitalna services (R) Kościerzyna — Gdańsk Osowa — Gdynia Główna

References

Skorzewo article at Polish Stations Database, URL accessed at 6 March 2006
 This article is based upon a translation of the Polish language version as of July 2016.

External links

Railway stations in Pomeranian Voivodeship
Kościerzyna County